Cristina Sara Piña (born 1949) is an Argentine poet and literary scholar. She was born in Buenos Aires and studied at the University of Salvador. Since 1977, she has taught at the Universidad Nacional Mar del Plata. 

A prolific writer and translator, she has published numerous books and academic papers. Starting with her debut collection in 1979, she has more than ten poetry books to her name. She is considered to be a leading scholar on the life and work of Alejandra Pizarnik. As a translator, she has translated several dozen works of fiction and non-fiction from English and French into Spanish. She has also translated the plays of Shakespeare, Synge, Ionesco and Tennessee Williams.

References

Argentine writers
1949 births
Living people